Stirling Burghs  was a district of burghs constituency of the House of Commons of the Parliament of the United Kingdom from 1708 to 1918.

Creation
The British parliamentary constituency was created in 1708 following the Acts of Union, 1707 and replaced the former Parliament of Scotland burgh constituencies of  Stirling, Culross, Dunfermline, Inverkeithing and Queensferry

Boundaries
The constituency comprised the burghs of Stirling in Stirlingshire, Dunfermline, and Inverkeithing in Fife, Queensferry, in Linlithgowshire (West Lothian), and Culross, which was an exclave of Perthshire, transferring to Fife in 1889. By 1832, the burgh of Queensferry had become the burgh of South Queensferry.

History
The constituency elected one Member of Parliament (MP) by the first past the post system until the seat was abolished for the 1918 general election.

In 1918, Stirling became part of Stirling and Falkirk Burghs and Dunfermline became part of Dunfermline Burghs, with the other burghs being represented as part of their respective counties.

Members of Parliament

Election results 1708-1885

Elections in the 1830s

Primrose was appointed as a Civil Lord of the Admiralty, requiring a by-election.

Elections in the 1840s

Elections in the 1850s

Elections in the 1860s

Oliphant resigned, causing a by-election.

Elections in the 1870s

Elections in the 1880s

Campbell-Bannerman was appointed Chief Secretary to the Lord Lieutenant of Ireland, requiring a by-election.

Election results 1885-1918

Elections in the 1880s

A by-election was called after Campbell-Bannerman accepted office as Secretary of State for War as at that time Cabinet Ministers were required on appointment to submit themselves for re-election.

Elections in the 1890s

Campbell-Bannerman was appointed Secretary of State for War requiring a by-election.

Elections in the 1900s

Elections in the 1910s

See also
Black Bond
Stirling (UK Parliament constituency) (created 1983)

References

Historic parliamentary constituencies in Scotland (Westminster)
Constituencies of the Parliament of the United Kingdom established in 1708
Constituencies of the Parliament of the United Kingdom disestablished in 1918
Constituencies of the Parliament of the United Kingdom represented by a sitting Prime Minister
Stirlingshire
Politics of Fife
Politics of Stirling (council area)